Benedetto II Zaccaria (died 1330) was the co-Lord of Chios, as well as many other Aegean islands from 1314 until ca. 1325.

Benedetto II was the cousin of Paleologo Zaccaria, and succeeded him in Chios and other lands in the Aegean Sea together with his brother Martino. Sometime after 1325 the latter forced him to retire, in exchange for a pension. Benedetto asked for help from the Byzantine emperor, Andronikos III Palaiologos. In 1329, Martin was declared deposed and captured by an imperial fleet of 105 ships sent to Chios.

Benedetto was appointed as imperial prefect of the island. However, after he died childless, the island was annexed to the Byzantine Empire. Phocaea was recaptured by the Byzantines in 1334.

Benedetto married Ginevra Doria, daughter of Corrado Doria.

Sources
 
 
 

1330s deaths
Christians of the Crusades
Lords of Chios
Year of birth unknown
Zaccaria family
14th-century Genoese people

ca:Benet II Paleòleg